The Statue of Belief or Vishwas Swaroopam is a statue of the Hindu God Shiva constructed at Nathdwara in Rajasthan, India. The statue opened on 29 October 2022. Currently, the Statue of Belief is the tallest statue of Lord Shiva in the World.

Description 
Shiva is depicted in a seated position with his legs crossed and holding a trishula in his left hand. Shiva's left foot is thrown over the knee of his right foot. The facial expression is detached, meditative. "The 'Statue of Faith' has a distinctive copper shade.
There are two vantage points that offer a panoramic view of the surrounding countryside. 
The Shiva statue began to be designed in 2011, built in 2016 and completed only in 2020.
 
The 16-acre grounds also include a parking facility, three herbal gardens, a food court, a laser fountain, and an area for handicraft shops, viewing platforms, musical fountains, souvenir shops and a pond. There is a mini-train on site for quick local sightseeing.

Construction 
The statue was conceived of by Indian businessman Madan Paliwal and constructed by Shapoorji Pallonji.Statue of belief sculptured by Naresh Kumawat  The structure consists of an inner core of reinforced cement concrete walls surrounded by a structural steel framework which is itself surrounded by a moulded ultra-high-performance concrete exterior. The surface was sprayed with liquified zinc, then coated with copper.

See also
 List of tallest statues
 Kailashnath Mahadev Statue, in Nepal, the second tallest Shiva statue in the world

References

External link 
 
 

Concrete sculptures
Shiva in art
Tourist attractions in Rajsamand district
2013 establishments in Rajasthan
2019 sculptures
Religious buildings and structures completed in 2019
August 2019 events in India
2022 sculptures